Svetilnovo is a rural locality (a village) in Kupriyanovskoye Rural Settlement, Gorokhovetsky District, Vladimir Oblast, Russia. The population was 8 as of 2010. There are 2 streets.

Geography 
Svetilnovo is located 10 km southeast of Gorokhovets (the district's administrative centre) by road. Velikovo is the nearest rural locality.

References 

Rural localities in Gorokhovetsky District